The SWAG Cup (Sports Writers Association of Ghana Cup) is an annual one-off game, featuring two selected clubs at the end of the season. The cup is called the H.P. Nyemitei Cup in honour of former GFA president Henry Plange Nyemitei and the SIC H.P. Nyemitei Cup for sponsorship reasons. football season. The game is the official shutdown match for the football season in Ghana.

Organised by the SWAG, proceeds from the game go into programmes of SWAG including SWAG Awards and other community development activities of the organization. The fixture was first played in the 1972 season.

The current holders are Asante Kotoko, who defeated rivals Ashanti Gold 1–0 in the 2015 match. Asante Kotoko who also hold the record for most wins with 16 titles.

History 
The SWAG cup was instituted by the Sports Writers Association Ghana in 1972,  with the first edition being played on 31 December 1972 between Ebusua Dwarfs and Hearts of Oak at Ohene Djan Stadium, Accra as Dwarfs defeated Hearts 3–1 to emerge as the inaugural winners. The second edition was organized on 23 December 1973 with Hearts of Oak beating Kumasi Cornerstone 1–0 through by Robert Hammond at the Ohene Djan Stadium.

The SWAG cup is called H.P. Nyemitei Cup as it is played in honor of  Henry Plange Nyemitei, a former Ghana Football Association President, Accra Hearts of Oak Director, who also worked as a Deputy Managing Director of the State Insurance Company (SIC) who are the sponsors of match. Nyemetei was also the Chief Patron of SWAG. Since 1983, SIC has been the headline sponsors of the match. They support the annual match by assisting the association in raising funds for its social, community development activities and programmes including the SWAG Awards and also serving as a catalyst in social development through football.

In 2015, Asante Kotoko defeated Ashanti Gold by 1–0, via a late free kick from Eric Donkor.

List of finals 
Source:

Performance by club 

Note: *  are shared titles

See also 

 Football in Ghana
 Ghana Premier League
 Ghana FA Cup

References

External links 

 SWAG Cup on RSSSF

Football competitions in Ghana
Football cup competitions in Ghana
Recurring sporting events established in 1972
1972 establishments in Ghana